Advance and Be Mechanized is a 1967 animated short that was the penultimate Tom and Jerry cartoon in the Chuck Jones era. It was directed by Ben Washam and produced by Chuck Jones, and is the third and final outer space themed shorts from the Chuck Jones era, following O-Solar Meow, and Guided Mouse-ille both released earlier in 1967.

Plot
The cartoon starts from another planet. One day, Jerry wants to get some cheese from the other room. He uses his robotic counterpart (Robot-Jerry) to enter the room and fetch him some cheese. The robot mouse goes in the room, taking a pile of cheese before leaving.

Meanwhile, Tom is a policeman, as he tries to look at the situation in panoramic parea, sees the mouse toy from the camera. He calls for his robotic counterpart (Mechano) to get rid of him for the last time. The mouse robot returns to the hole, but Mechano grabs his tail and unscrews him bit by bit until he has been destroyed, then he takes the cheese. After this scene, Jerry is disappointing that his robot's mission had failed and that he had lost his meal. Tom is seen laughing at Jerry's misfortune as Mechano returns to his master, and then he pats the robot cat, as if to praise him for his success.

The next scene, Tom is hungry when a lunch whistle starts to blow loudly. Tom runs to a line of robots, who are waiting at a machine to give them some oil. When Tom is fed, and realizes that it tastes bad, he knocks the can off in the robot arm and bangs on the machine in an attempt to either get his money back or be served a regular food. When he gets no response, he gets set to kick it until it "grabs" and kicks him.

Tom returns to work until he sees Jerry coming outside from his hole, he chases the mouse so that only allowed to eat him as he enters the same machine with Tom to ate from. He goes over a coin slot, ends up stuttered in a hamburger with an arm to put some spicy chilli sauce on him. After it explodes in hotness, Jerry puts the sauce bottle in the hamburger. Tom eats without knowing what Jerry did and it explodes in spiciness before the machine gives him a glass of water.

In the same scene, following on the other space-age shorts as Tom sees the robot-Jerry again continues. After being spotted robot-Jerry rushes once again from the camera, Tom calls for his minion. Then Mechano chases robot-Jerry, but robot-Jerry levitates himself into the air. Mechano extends his legs up and tries again, but then the robot-Jerry drops himself. Mechano continues his chase until he is almost wrecked over some obstacles. Mechano crouches to avoid a large fixture, and then extends himself high to avoid the second one. He chases robot-Jerry again until he hits over a doorjamb.

Mechano gets angry with Tom's gasps when his robot-cat takes control of his machine and trying to scold his robot-cat fails then turns him into the minion. Jerry sees this was laughing as a good thing, but the robot-Jerry was injured when he fails again to grab the cheese before the real Jerry becomes the robot-Jerry's minion. Both the robots control the furry leaders, as Jerry slaps Tom first. Tom hits back and they return to Jerry and Tom battling each other. This repeats over and over again and never stops, before the cartoon closes.

Crew
Animation: Dick Thompson, Ben Washam, Don Towsley & Philip Roman
Layouts: Don Morgan
Backgrounds: Philip DeGuard & Thelma Witmer
Design Consultant: Maurice Noble
Vocal Effects: Mel Blanc, June Foray & William Hanna
Production Manager: Earl Jonas
Story: Bob Ogle & John Dunn
Music: Dean Elliott
Co-ordinator: Nick Iuppa
Production Supervised by Les Goldman
Produced by Chuck Jones
Directed by Ben Washam & Abe Levitow

References

External links

1967 films
1967 animated films
1967 short films
Short films directed by Ben Washam
Tom and Jerry short films
1960s American animated films
Animated films without speech
1960s science fiction comedy films
American robot films
American science fiction comedy films
Animated films about robots
Animated films about extraterrestrial life
Films scored by Dean Elliott
1967 comedy films
MGM Animation/Visual Arts short films
1960s English-language films